National Highway 512 (NH 512) is a highway in the Indian state of West Bengal. It is proposed to build four lane road. It runs from Gazole to Hili border with Bangladesh. On the other side of the border, the road continues as Hili-Birampur Highway.

Changeover
The Gazole-Hili stretch is shown both as part of State Highway 10 (West Bengal) and NH 512 in Google maps and other places. The West Bengal government, with the permission of the central government, has taken up the repair and maintenance of six major highways, which will eventually be  
raised to the status of a national highway. This includes the Gazole-Hili stretch.

Route 
Gajol - Daulatpur - Bansihari- Gangarampur - Harsura - Balurghat - Hilli (near Indo/Bangladesh Border).

See also
 List of National Highways in India (by Highway Number)
 National Highways Development Project

References

External links 
 NH 512 on OpenStreetMap

National highways in India
National Highways in West Bengal